Saltburn-by-the-Sea, commonly referred to as Saltburn, is a seaside town in Redcar and Cleveland, North Yorkshire, England, around  south-east of Hartlepool and southeast of Redcar. 

It lies within the historic boundaries of the North Riding of Yorkshire. It had a population of 5,958 in 2011.

The development of Middlesbrough and Saltburn was driven by the discovery of ironstone in the Cleveland Hills and the building of two railways to transport the minerals.

History

Old Saltburn

Old Saltburn is the original settlement, located in the Saltburn Gill. Records are scarce on its origins, but it was a centre for smugglers, and publican John Andrew is referred to as 'king of smugglers'.

In 1856, the hamlet consisted of the Ship Inn and a row of houses, occupied by farmers and fishermen.
In the mid-18th century, authors Laurence Sterne and John Hall-Stevenson enjoyed racing chariots on the sands at Saltburn.

Victorian era

The Pease family of Darlington developed Middlesbrough as an industrial centre and, after discovery of iron stone, the Stockton & Darlington Railway and the West Hartlepool Harbour and Railway Company developed routes into East Cleveland.
By 1861, the S&DR reached Saltburn with the intention of continuing to Brotton, Skinningrove and Loftus; but the WHH&RCo had already developed tracks in the area, leaving little point in extending the S&DR tracks further.

In 1858, while walking along the coast path towards Old Saltburn to visit his brother Joseph in Marske-by-the-Sea, Henry Pease saw "a prophetic vision of a town arising on the cliff and the quiet, unfrequented and sheltered glen turned into a lovely garden".

The Pease family owned Middlesbrough Estate and had control of the S&DR, and agreed to develop Henry's vision by forming the Saltburn Improvement Company (SIC). Land was purchased from the Earl of Zetland, and the company commissioned surveyor George Dickinson to lay out what became an interpretation of a gridiron street layout, although this was interrupted by the railway which ran through the site. With as many houses as possible having sea views, the so-called "Jewel streets" along the seafront—Coral, Garnet, Ruby, Emerald, Pearl, Diamond and Amber Streets, said to be a legacy of Henry's vision, were additional to the grid pattern.

After securing the best positions for development by the SIC, money was raised for construction by selling plots to private developers and investors. Most buildings are constructed using 'Pease' brick, transported from Darlington by the S&DR, with the name Pease set into the brick. The jewel in Henry Pease's crown is said to have been The Zetland Hotel with a private platform, one of the world's earliest railway hotels.

The parcel of land known as Clifton Villas was sold by the SIC in 1865 to William Morley from London who built the property, 'The Cottage' (now Teddy's Nook) on a site originally intended for three villas. The SIC stipulated in the deed of covenant that "any trees planted along Britannia Terrace (now Marine Parade) were not to exceed 1' 6" above the footpath" (46 cm) to preserve sea views for Britannia Terrace residents and visitors.

The Redcar to Saltburn Railway opened in 1861 as an extension of the Middlesbrough to Redcar Railway of 1846. The line was extended to Whitby as part of the Whitby Redcar and Middlesbrough Union Railway.

Geography 
The coastline at Saltburn lies practically east–west, and along much of it runs Marine Parade.
Skelton Beck runs through the wooded Valley Gardens in Saltburn, then alongside Saltburn Miniature Railway before being joined by Saltburn Gill going under the A174 road bridge and entering the North Sea across the sandy beach. The A174 road number is now used for the Skelton/Brotton Bypass.

Landmarks 

A forest walk in the Valley Gardens gives access to the Italian Gardens and leads on to the railway viaduct.
On the shore of Old Saltburn stands the Ship Inn, which dates to the 17th century.
In the town there are plenty of Victorian buildings.
There is also a thriving local theatre, The 53 Society, and a public library.

Cliff lift

The Saltburn Cliff Lift is one of the world's oldest water-powered funiculars—the oldest being the Bom Jesus funicular in Braga, Portugal.
After the opening of Saltburn Pier in 1869, it was concluded that the steep cliff walk was deterring people from walking from the town to the pier.
After the company was taken over by Middlesbrough Estates in 1883, they discovered that the wooden Cliff Hoist had a number of rotten supports.

The Saltburn tramway, as it is also known, was developed by Sir Richard Tangye's company, whose chief engineer was George Croydon Marks. The cliff tramway opened a year later and provided transport between the pier and the town.  The railway is water-balanced and since 1924 the water pump has been electrically operated.  The first major maintenance was carried out in 1998, when the main winding wheel was replaced and a new braking system was installed.

Pier

Saltburn's attractions include a Grade II* renovated pier, the only pleasure pier on the whole of the Northeast and Yorkshire coast.

Miniature railway 

The Saltburn Miniature Railway is a  gauge railway that runs south from Cat Nab Station close to the beach, for about ½ mile inland to Forest Halt, where there is a woodland walk and the Italian Gardens.

Public houses 
As the town had been founded by Quakers, the SIC had a ban on public houses. Alcohol was served in the hotels and the bars attached to them, and in private members' clubs, which included; Ruby Street Social Club (formerly The British Legion; now demolished), Lune Street Social Club (Top Club), Milton Street Social Club (Bottom Club), The Red Lodge, The Conservative Club, Saltburn Golf Club, Saltburn Cricket, Tennis and Bowls Club and The Queens (known locally as The Swingdoors).

Saltburn's first public house (independent of an existing hotel) was The Victoria, opened on 8 December 1982. 

Today the following public houses exist in Saltburn: Alexandra Vaults (known locally as Back Alex), The Victoria, The Marine, The Ship Inn, Vista Mar and The Hop and Vine (formerly Windsor's).

Teddy's Nook (The Cottage) 
Teddy's Nook is a house built in 1862 by Henry Pease, a director of the Stockton and Darlington Railway, for his own occupation.
Pease was responsible for the foundation of the seaside resort and the sturdy sandstone house was first named The Cottage.

Lillie Langtry—The Jersey Lily, stayed at the house at sometime between 1877 and 1880. She was often visited by Edward Prince of Wales (later Edward VII of the United Kingdom) who had a suite of rooms at the Zetland Hotel.
The cottage, consequently, became known as Teddy's Nook.

The Cottage was only one of four similar houses to be called Clifton Villas.
The cottage was the family home of Audrey Collins, MBE, who served as Mayor of Saltburn and chair of the South Tees Health Authority. Middlesbrough's James Cook University Hospital has named a teaching unit in her name.

Saltburn Valley Woods 

Locally knows as Fairy Glen, the Saltburn Valley Woods run through Saltburn Beck. Places in these woods include the Stepping Stones and the Saltburn Viaduct.

Education 

Saltburn's only secondary school is Huntcliff School which was rebuilt during 2007–8, re-opening on 8 September 2008. The redundant 50-year-old school buildings were then demolished to allow the town's Junior and Infant schools to relocate to the same site in 2009 because the Junior and Infant schools used to be located in a different building, not in the campus area.

History of Education 
In the early 1900's the building where the Earthbeat Centre is now located was previously a girls Grammar School, and a later a primary school until 2009. "After many months of intensive renovation the former Saltburn School has now opened its doors to the public as the Earthbeat Centre." The site is now the permanent home of The Earthbeat Centre for the next 50 years (as of 2015).

Transport 

Beyond Saltburn a mineral goods line continues across Saltburn Viaduct and the edge of Hunt Cliff to the potash mine at nearby Boulby.

There are four buses an hour to Redcar and Middlesbrough and two an hour to Loftus and Whitby. There was an infrequent direct bus service to Guisborough and Stokesley, Monday to Friday only, but this was withdrawn in January 2023.

Sport 

Sports played in Saltburn include cricket, bowls and tennis also played at the Club in Marske Mill Lane.
The club has existed for over 100 years and is nearly as old as the town itself.
New facilities were provided in 2002 with financial help from the Lottery. The Saltburn Cricket Club play in the NYSD league.

The North Riding Duck Race is held each year on 1 August to celebrate Yorkshire Day.
The winner receives the Colin Holt Cup, named in honour of the late Colin Holt, for many years the Chairman of the Yorkshire Ridings Society. A prize is given also for the duck with the most original name.

The coastline is known for national surfing events held during the autumn and winter months, attracting competitors from England, Scotland and Wales.

Culture and events 

Annual events include the Saltburn Custom Classic Car Show—a lower prom display of mostly American cars—and the Saltburn Festival of Folk Music, Dance and Song.

Notable people 

Grandson of the naturalist Charles Darwin, Erasmus Darwin IV lived in Albion Terrace (1911 census).  He served in the First World War and was killed in 1915. He is commemorated on the town's war memorial.
Speed record breaker Sir Malcolm Campbell set his first speed record (138.08  mph, unofficial) while driving Blue Bird on Saltburn Sands on 17 June 1922.
Deep Purple and Whitesnake lead vocalist David Coverdale (now a United States citizen) grew up in the Red Lodge on Marine Parade, now known as Red Gables.
American astronaut Nicholas Patrick was born in Saltburn.
Professional footballers and football managers George Hardwick, Tony Mowbray and Graeme Murty were all born in Saltburn.
Astrophysicist Carole Ann Haswell, who has discovered several exoplanets, was born in Saltburn.

References

External links 

 The Earthbeat Centre
 Local Community Website
 History of Saltburn by the Sea
 .

 
Seaside resorts in England
Places in the Tees Valley
Port cities and towns of the North Sea
Surfing locations in England
Towns in North Yorkshire
Populated coastal places in Redcar and Cleveland